The Moesian Limes is the modern term given to a collection of Roman fortifications between the Black Sea shore and Pannonia, present-day Hungary, consisting primarily of forts along the Danube (so-called Danubian Limes) to protect the Roman provinces of Upper and Lower Moesia south of the river. 

In addition the term Limes Moesiae may be used to include many other linked lines of defence were established in the region in different periods and later abandoned in favour of others depending on the military situation.

Characteristics

The Limes Moesiae includes essentially the linked forts and stations along the Danube from Singidunum (Belgrade) to the mouth of the Danube on the Black Sea. It was not fortified with palisades or a boundary wall but the forts were linked by a road and included eight legionary fortresses, many forts for auxiliary troops and watch/signal towers. The legionary fortresses included:

Singidunum (Belgrade)
Viminatium
Aquae (Prahovo)
Ratiaria (near the town of Artschar)
Oescus
Novae (near the town of Svishtov)
Dorostorum (near the town of Silistra)
Troesmis

Other forts included:
Augustae (near the village of Hurlets)
Valeriana (near the village of Dolni Vadin)
Variana (near the village of Leskowez)
Almus (near the town of Lom)
Regianum (near the town of Kozloduy)
Sexaginta Prista (near the town of Ruse)

The frontier was divided into two major sections by the river Iskar at Oescus which also marked the border between the provinces of Moesia Superior and Inferior.  

The narrowness of the river at Djerdap formed a barrier between north-west and north-east Moesia that was difficult to overcome, initially making communication between the Pannonian and the Moesian armies difficult. This problem was solved only by the construction of a 3m wide road under Trajan, who had the Legio VII Claudia chisel into the rock walls replacing a wooden towpath construction that was susceptible to damage by drift ice. Other improvements for shipping included the construction of a canal near Novi Sip to avoid the dangerous rapids and shoals there. The two ends of the canal were secured with forts. The best-known building on the Moesian Limes was Trajan's Bridge at Drobeta/ Turnu Severin from the early 2nd century AD, the first permanent bridge connection across the lower Danube which was also guarded on both banks by forts.

The Limes Moesiae may also include, depending on authors:
 two lines of defense in Wallachia: the Constantine Wall and the Limes Transalutanus.
 the Constantine Wall, or Brazda lui Novac de Nord in Walachia from around 330 AD and 300 km long.
 the Limes Transalutanus, probably built by Hadrian to defend Roman Dacia, between the southern Carpathian mountains and the Danube.
 possibly the so-called Trajan's Walls between Constanta and the Danube, Lower Trajan's Wall or Athanaric's Wall just north of the Danube delta in Moldova and Upper Trajan's Wall or Greuthungi Wall in central Moldova from the Prut to the Dniester rivers, although they may not have been Roman.

Many of these walls consisted of earth ditches, 3 m high and 2 m wide, and similar to the Antonine Wall.

The Limes was used by non-Roman kingdoms after the 5th and 6th century and partially rebuilt and increased.

History 
During 29 and 28 BC shortly after the battle of Actium Marcus Licinius Crassus, proconsul of Macedonia and grandson of the triumvir, conquered the territory which was to become Moesia. Augustus formally proclaimed this event in 27 BC in Rome. Two legions (Legio IV Scythica and V Macedonica) were initially stationed in Moesia to counter threats from neighbouring Thrace and aggressive peoples north of the Danube. Auxiliary and smaller forts for vexillations of these legions were built along the Danube. At this stage forts on the frontier consisted of earth walls with wooden palisades. The wood and earth constructions were replaced by stone walls just before Domitian's Dacian War in 87 AD (for example at Taliata and Smyrna).

In the winter of 98/99 AD Trajan arrived on the Danube, quartered at the Diana fort near Kladovo, and started Dacian war preparations on the Iron Gates gorges. He extended the road in the gorge for 30 miles, as he stated on the well-known inscription of 100 AD. In 101 AD he also cut a canal nearby, as he also recorded on a marble plaque which reads:

“that because of the dangerous cataracts he diverted the river and made the whole Danube navigable”: (ob periculum cataractarum, derivato flumine, tutam Danuvii navigationem facit).

Trajan restored stone defences in the area and rebuilt all earthworks in stone. Just below the Pontes fort a large port and massive horrea were built. 

Between the first and second Dacian wars, from 103 to 105, the imperial architect Apollodorus of Damascus constructed Trajan's Bridge one of the greatest achievements in Roman architecture.

Full military occupation of the plain between the Carpathian foothills and the Danube may already have occurred
by the end of Trajan’s First Dacian War (101/102). The majority of forts here, however, were established after the final conquest of the Dacian kingdom in 106 AD. The abandonment of Moldova and the creation of the Limes Transalutanus can both be tentatively dated to the reign of Hadrian.

After a long period of peace Septimius Severus reconstructed the Moesia Superior defences and under Caracalla more reconstruction was done as can be seen at Pontes where, as with many other Iron Gates forts, the original layout was supplemented with the gates and towers. A new fort was built on an island at the Porečka river.  

The Roman abandonment of Dacia probably occurred during the reign of Gallienus (260-68), before the traditional date of around 275 when Aurelian established the new province of Dacia south of the Danube (Cătăniciu 1981, 53-55).

In the Late Roman period, the extent of control and military occupation over territory north of the Danube remains controversial. One Roman fort (Pietroasa de Jos), well beyond the Danubian Limes and near Moldavia, seems to have been occupied in the 4th century AD, as were bridge-head forts (Sucidava, Barboşi, and the unlocated Constantiniana Daphne) along the left bank of the river. In this Roman fort, built by Constantine I, researchers found a thermae building.

The "Brazda lui Novac de Nord" (or "Constantine Wall") has been shown by recent excavations to date from emperor Constantine around 330 AD, at the same time as the "Devil's Dykes" (or "Limes Sarmatiae"), a series of defensive earthen ramparts-and-ditches built by the Romans between Romania and the Pannonian plains.

Similarly, although considered 1st century and believed to predate the Limes Transalutanus, the function and
origins of a shorter section of bank and ditch known as the "Brazda lui Novac de Sud" remain uncertain. The absence of any evidence for Late Roman forts or settlements along its course and south of it rather suggests a later, probably medieval, date.

The fortification line erected by the king of the Thervings Athanaric, between the banks of river Gerasius (modern Prut) and the Danube to the land of Taifali (modern Oltenia), probably reused the old Roman limes called Limes Transalutanus

Controversy

There is a controversy over the historical perspective of who built the earth dykes: the Romans, the Byzantines or others:
 Roman explanation: Emperor Nero extended the Roman Moesia province north of the Danube delta in 56 AD until Tyras (near actual Odessa), according to Mommsen and this is historically confirmed. With Emperor Trajan they connected the conquered Dacia with the mouth of the Dniester river and probably did the first construction of the earth dyke that later was called Greuthungi Wall. With emperor Hadrian came the consolidation of the Roman territories and the limes was withdrawn to the "Limes Transalutanus" and the smallest "Trajan Wall" between Constanta and the Danube: these two Walls are confirmed to be Romans. When the Roman Empire expanded again after the loss of Roman Dacia, Emperor Constantine made the "Constantine Wall" as a limes (occupying all Wallachia south of the southern Carpathians mountains) until the earth dyke later called "Antharic Wall". Has been demonstrated by academics  that the "Constantine Wall" was built by the Romans around 330 AD and was increased many times until Emperor Justinian in the 6th century.
 Byzantine possibility: Probably the Eastern Roman Empire built or enlarged the two sections of the Limes Moesiae north on the Danube delta, between the 6th and the 10th centuries. They wanted to defend the Greek colonies in the Black Sea coast (between the Danube and Crimea) from the continuous barbarian invasions.
 There it is even another theory: the Barbarian. This hypothesizes a  Trajan's Wall, not related to the Roman Empire. This Trajan's Wall should be connected to the Serpent's Wall, made by Barbarian Kingdoms, that stretched from Bucovina to central Ukraine. This theory  supports the opinion that the "Athanaric Wall" and the "Greuthungi Wall" are not Roman, creating a controversy.

See also
 Trajan's Wall
 Limes Transalutanus
 Lower Trajan's Wall
 Tyras
 Pietroasele

Notes

Bibliography
 
 Heather, Peter. The Goths. Blackwell ed.  Malden, 1998.
 Mommsen, Theodore. The Provinces of the Roman Empire. Barnes & Noble Books. New York, 1996 
 Wacher, J.S. The Roman world. Routledge Publisher. New York, 2002.

External links
 Roman presence north of the lower Danube delta

Roman frontiers
Moesia
Moesia Superior
Moesia Inferior
Roman fortifications in Serbia
Roman fortifications in Bulgaria
Roman fortifications in Romania
Roman Dacia